Alexander O'Neal (born November 15, 1953) is an American R&B singer, songwriter and arranger from Natchez, Mississippi.

O'Neal came to prominence in the mid-1980s as a solo artist, with eleven Top 40 singles on the US R&B chart, three of which also reached the Top 40 of the Billboard Hot 100. However, he enjoyed more mainstream success in the United Kingdom, achieving fourteen Top 40 singles on the UK Singles Chart between 1985 and 1996, along with three top ten albums on the UK Albums Chart.

His solo singles, sometimes dealing with lost love, include "If You Were Here Tonight", "Fake", "Criticize", "The Lovers", "(What Can I Say) To Make You Love Me", "All True Man", "Love Makes No Sense" and "In the Middle". He is also known for duets with Tabu labelmate Cherrelle such as "Saturday Love" and "Never Knew Love Like This". AllMusic described O'Neal as having a "tough voice [that] has the same grain and range as that of Otis Redding."

Early life
Alexander O'Neal was born November 15, 1953, in Natchez, Mississippi, United States, just a few months after his father died. After graduating from high school in Natchez, he attended Alcorn State University. At the age of 20, he relocated to Minneapolis, where he performed with several bands including the Mystics and Wynd Chymes. He became a member of Enterprise for a brief period before joining Flyte Tyme, a band which included Monte Moir, Jimmy Jam and Terry Lewis.

O'Neal released his debut album, the eponymous Alexander O'Neal, in 1985. Since then, he has released nine studio albums, six compilation albums and two live albums.

Early career
According to Jimmy Jam, In 1980/1981 O'Neal (along with fellow members of the band Flyte Tyme) met with Prince and Morris Day at Perkins restaurant in Minneapolis to discuss forming a band that would be called The Time that would be signed to Prince under the Warner Bros. label. Following a disagreement with Prince, O'Neal was replaced as lead singer by Morris Day.

O'Neal subsequently formed an R&B band called Alexander and recorded a couple 12" singles, "Do You Dare/Playroom" and "Attitude" for a Chicago area independent label, based in Merrillville, Indiana, called Erect Records.

In 1984 O'Neal signed a deal with Clarence Avant's Tabu Records. He did some backing vocals for other artists on the same label, including The S.O.S. Band and Cherrelle.

1985–present: solo career
In 1985, O'Neal released his self-titled debut album under the production of Jimmy Jam and Terry Lewis as well as Monte Moir. It included three singles that reached the Top 20 of the R&B Singles Chart. The same year, he also scored his first R&B Top 10 single with "Saturday Love", a duet with Cherrelle from her High Priority album. The song peaked at #2 on the R&B chart and #26 on the pop chart, while also beginning a string of UK hit singles for O'Neal by peaking at #6 on the UK Singles Chart in early 1986. This UK success continued when "If You Were Here Tonight", which had previously peaked at #81, re-entered the charts to reach #13 in March 1986.

In 1987, O'Neal released the album Hearsay, which was certified gold in the US and yielded his biggest US hit in "Fake", which topped the R&B chart and reached #25 on the pop chart. The song also peaked at #7 on the Billboard dance chart. The follow-up single, "Criticize", peaked at #4 on the R&B chart and #70 on the pop chart. The third single, "Never Knew Love Like This", another duet with Cherrelle, peaked at #2 on the R&B chart and #28 on the pop chart. However, by this time O'Neal was enjoying much greater success in the UK, where Hearsay peaked at #4 on the UK Albums Chart, eventually being certified triple platinum and spawning six Top 40 hits on the UK Singles Chart. The most successful of these gave O'Neal his biggest UK hit when "Criticize" peaked at #4 on the chart in late 1987. "Fake" became a UK Top 40 hit twice, first in 1987 followed by a remix ("Fake '88") in 1988. The "Hit Mix" (a megamix of O'Neal's hits) also reached the UK Top 20 in December 1989.

In December 1988 O'Neal released a Christmas album, My Gift to You, featuring a cover of "The Christmas Song" that reached the UK Top 40.

In 1991, O'Neal released his fourth album, All True Man. The album was certified gold in the US, with the title track reaching #5 on the R&B chart and #43 on the pop chart. The album became his highest charting release in the UK, reaching #2 and going gold, although it ultimately sold fewer copies than Hearsay. The title track reached #18 on the UK Singles Chart. In 1992, his first greatest hits album, This Thing Called Love: The Greatest Hits of Alexander O'Neal, became another Top 5 success in the UK.

In 1993, O'Neal's final album with the Tabu label, Love Makes No Sense, was released. This was the first album made without production from Jam and Lewis. Although it reached the UK Top 20 and two singles from the album reached the UK Top 40, sales were not as strong as his earlier releases. After leaving Tabu O'Neal signed for Motown, but no singles or albums were released. In 1995, another greatest hits compilation, The Best of Alexander O'Neal, was released.  A year later the compilation was re-released with three added tracks from O'Neal's short period with Motown.

In 1996, his first album with One World Records, Lovers Again, was released. The album did not chart in the UK, though the single "Let's Get Together" reached the UK Top 40. In 2001, he released an album on Eagle Records, Saga of a Married Man. The album was produced by former Prince drummer, Bobby Z. In 2005, he recorded his first live album, Alexander O'Neal Live at Hammersmith Apollo, featuring songs from throughout his career.

In 2008, O'Neal released Alex Loves..., his first studio album in six years. The album peaked at #49 in the UK, and was his first charting album of new material in 15 years.

In 2014, O'Neal signed a new management deal with Howard Perl Management (Beverly Hills), which awarded him extensive tours and a cast member on Celebrity Big Brother.

In June 2016, O'Neal collaborated with Manchester-based funk band, Mamma Freedom, on the single, "Fake", a re-recording of his 1987 single of the same name. The single was released shortly before O'Neal embarked upon a UK tour, with Mamma Freedom providing support.

In 2017, O'Neal collaborated with Manchester-based funk band Mamma Freedom on the album "Hearsay30", a re-recording of his 1987 album. The album was released on December 1, 2017.

In 2019, O'Neal made an appearance alongside Cherrelle at the Soul Train Awards to pay tribute to long-time collaborators Jimmy Jam and Terry Lewis.

In 2021, O'Neal made an appearance alongside Whyso, O'Mega Red, and J Dore of The High Children on "Say His Name," a song dedicated to the memory of George Floyd.

Television
In 2006 O'Neal appeared on the Weakest Link, All Singing All Dancing Edition, where he was the 5th contestant voted off the show. In 2006 and 2007, O'Neal participated on the British reality singing contest show Just the Two of Us. In 2008 O'Neal took part in a Wife Swap UK special, swapping his wife Cynthia with broadcaster and TV personality Jilly Goolden. The programme included an in-depth interview with O'Neal by noted UK R&B writer Pete Lewis of the award-winning magazine Blues & Soul. The interview was featured in full in the August 2008 issue of the magazine.

In 2011 the TV One series Unsung profiled O'Neal's rise to fame, along with the story of Cherrelle.

In 2015 O'Neal took part in the Channel 5 reality series Celebrity Big Brother. On Day 12, O'Neal decided to leave the show.

Honors and awards
O'Neal was honored with a star on the outside mural of the Minneapolis nightclub First Avenue, recognizing performers that have played sold-out shows or have otherwise demonstrated a major contribution to the culture at the iconic venue. Receiving a star "might be the most prestigious public honor an artist can receive in Minneapolis," according to journalist Steve Marsh.

Discography

Studio albums
 Alexander O'Neal (1985)
 Hearsay (1987)
 My Gift to You (1988)
 All True Man (1991)
 Love Makes No Sense (1993)
 Lovers Again (1996)
 Saga of a Married Man (2002)
 Alex Loves... (2008)
 Five Questions: The New Journey (2010)
 Hearsay 30 (2017)

Tours
 30 Years of Hearsay Tour (2017)

References

External links
Official site
Official Facebook Page

1953 births
Living people
Alcorn State University alumni
American emigrants to England
American funk singers
American soul musicians
EMI Records artists
Musicians from Minneapolis
Musicians from Natchez, Mississippi
The S.O.S. Band
American contemporary R&B singers
African-American male singer-songwriters
20th-century African-American male singers
21st-century African-American male singers
Singer-songwriters from Mississippi
Singer-songwriters from Minnesota